Banff and Buchan is a constituency of the House of Commons, located in the north-east of Scotland within the Aberdeenshire council area. It elects one Member of Parliament at least once every five years using the first-past-the-post system of voting.

The seat has been held by David Duguid of the Scottish Conservatives since 2017; until then the Scottish National Party (SNP) had held the seat since 1987, with the then First Minister of Scotland Alex Salmond representing the seat until 2010 and Eilidh Whiteford until 2017.

Constituency profile
A mostly rural constituency, it takes in the towns of Fraserburgh, Peterhead and Turriff, and the main industries are fishing and tourism.

The Aberdeenshire council area as a whole voted against Scottish independence in 2014.

61% of people in constituency are estimated to have voted in favour of leaving the European Union in the 2016 Brexit referendum.

In 2010, Eilidh Whiteford succeeded Alex Salmond as the MP for Banff and Buchan, but the SNP vote share fell below 50% for the first time since 1992, due to a strong challenge by the Conservative Party. In the 2015 general election, the SNP achieved its best-ever result in the constituency, with Whiteford winning a 60.2% share of the vote and increasing her majority by more than 10,300 votes.

In 2017, the constituency saw the second-largest swing to the Conservatives in all of Scotland (20.2%), bested only by the swing achieved by Colin Clark in defeating Salmond in the neighbouring seat of Gordon (20.4%). Observers attributed this to anger at the SNP's opposition to Brexit and support for a second independence referendum. After the election, The Guardian reported that, "In the coastal town of Peterhead, locals at the Waverley hotel were toasting Salmond's first defeat since being elected as an MP in 1987. Murdo MacKenzie, 51, a former fisherman, said there was a lot of anger about Sturgeon's stance on Europe. 'Europe is dictating our fishing quotas. I've voted SNP all my life but if you take the power away from Westminster and hand it to Brussels, how is that independence?'"

At the 2019 general election, Banff and Buchan's Conservative vote share bucked the Scottish trend and increased by 2.1%, increasing David Duguid's majority to over 4,000 votes and taking over 50% of the vote share.

Boundaries 

1983–1997: Banff and Buchan District.

1997–2005: The Banff and Buchan District electoral divisions of Banff and Portsoy, Deveron, Fraserburgh North, Fraserburgh South, Mid Buchan, Peterhead North, Peterhead South, and Ugie, Cruden and Boddam.

2005–present: The Aberdeenshire Council wards of Durn, Banff West and Boyndie, Banff, Aberchirder, Macduff, Gamrie King Edward, Buchan North, Fraserburgh West, Fraserburgh North, Fraserburgh East, Fraserburgh South, Buchan North East, South Buchan, Central Buchan, Lonmay and St Fergus, Mintlaw Old Deer, Mintlaw Longside, Boddam Inverugie, Blackhouse, Buchanhaven, Peterhead Central Roanheads, Clerkhill, Dales Towerhill, Cruden, Turriff West, Turriff East, Upper Ythan, and Fyvie Methlick.

As created in 1983, the constituency replaced part of East Aberdeenshire and part of Banffshire.

New boundaries were used for the 2005 general election, as recommended by the Fifth Periodical Report of the Boundary Commission for Scotland, and the constituency is now one of five covering the Aberdeenshire and Aberdeen City council areas. The Banff and Buchan constituency is entirely within the Aberdeenshire area, covering a northern portion of it. To the south, Gordon includes part of the Aberdeenshire area and part of the Aberdeen City area. Further south, West Aberdeenshire and Kincardine is entirely within the Aberdeenshire area and Aberdeen North and Aberdeen South are entirely within the Aberdeen City area.

The Banff and Buchan constituency continues to include the port towns of Peterhead and Fraserburgh. It also now includes Turriff, which was formerly within the Gordon constituency.

Members of Parliament

Election results

Elections in the 2010s 

1: After nominations were closed, Hoque was suspended from the Labour Party when he was charged with multiple driving offences.

The swing of 10.6% to the Conservatives in Banff and Buchan was the largest swing in Scotland at the 2010 general election.

Elections in the 2000s

Elections in the 1990s

Elections in the 1980s

References 
Specific

General

Westminster Parliamentary constituencies in Scotland
Constituencies of the Parliament of the United Kingdom established in 1983
Alex Salmond